The second season of the American television series Person of Interest premiered on September 27, 2012 on CBS and ended on May 9, 2013. The season is produced by Kilter Films, Bad Robot Productions, and Warner Bros. Television, with Jonathan Nolan, Greg Plageman, J. J. Abrams, and Bryan Burk serving as executive producers and Plageman serving as showrunner. 

The series was renewed for a second season in March 2012 and stars Jim Caviezel, Taraji P. Henson, Kevin Chapman and Michael Emerson. The series revolves around a mysterious reclusive billionaire computer programmer, Harold Finch, who has developed a computer program for the federal government known as "the Machine" that is capable of collating all sources of information to predict terrorist acts and to identify people planning them. The Machine also identifies perpetrators and victims of other premeditated deadly crimes; however, because the government considers these "irrelevant", Finch programs the Machine to delete this information each night and programs the Machine to notify him secretly of the "irrelevant" numbers. Finch recruits John Reese, a former Green Beret and CIA agent, now presumed dead – to investigate the people identified by the numbers the Machine has provided, and to act accordingly. 

Viewership for the season increased from the first season, with an average of 16.07 million viewers, ranking as the 5th most watched series of the 2012-13 television season. The season received positive reviews from critics, with many deeming it an improvement over the previous season, praising its performances, writing and subject matter. In March 2013, CBS renewed the series for a third season.

Season summary
The season starts with Reese rescuing Finch after he is kidnapped by Root. During the second season, Decima Technologies, a powerful and secretive private intelligence firm run by ex-MI6 spy and idealist John Greer, is revealed to be attempting to gain access to the Machine. Carter vows vengeance against HR after they have her boyfriend, Detective Cal Beecher, murdered. Reese and Finch encounter Sameen Shaw, a U.S. Army ISA assassin, on the run after being betrayed by her employers. Shaw learns about the Machine in the season two finale and subsequently becomes a member of Reese and Finch's team. The Machine is revealed to have developed sentience and covertly arranged for itself to be moved to an undisclosed location to protect itself from interference.

Cast and characters

Main
 Jim Caviezel as John Reese
 Taraji P. Henson as Joss Carter
 Kevin Chapman as Lionel Fusco
 Michael Emerson as Harold Finch

Recurring 
 Jay O. Sanders as Special Counsel
 Boris McGiver as Hersh
 Amy Acker as Samantha Groves/Root
 Robert John Burke as Patrick Simmons
 Clarke Peters as Alonzo Quinn
 Sterling K. Brown as Cal Beecher
 Brett Cullen as Nathan Ingram
 Brennan Brown as Nicholas Donnelly
 Al Sapienza as Raymond Terney
 Enrico Colantoni as Carl Elias
 Ken Leung as Leon Tao
 Carrie Preston as Grace Hendricks
 Sarah Shahi as Sameen Shaw
 Brendan Griffin as Charles Macavoy
 Brian Hutchison as Brian Moss
 Creighton James as Wayne Packer
 Michael Kelly as Mark Snow
 James Knight as Brian Kelly
 John Nolan as John Greer
 Annie Parisse as Kara Stanton
 Paige Turco as Zoe Morgan
 Michael McGlone as Bill Szymanski
 Cotter Smith as Denton Weeks
 Morgan Spector as Peter Yogorov
 James Hanlon as Jimmy Stills
 David Valcin as Anthony S. Marconi/Scarface

Notable guests
 Margo Martindale as Barbara Russell
 Jonathan Tucker as Riley Cavanaugh
 Gloria Votsis as Maxine Angelis
 John Ventimiglia as Christopher Zambrano
 Alicia Witt as Connie Wyler
 David Denman as Graham Wyler
 Sharon Leal as Dr. Madeleine Enright
 Julian Sands as Alistair Wesley
 Mark Pellegrino as Daniel Drake
 Francie Swift as Sabrina Drake
 Michael Irby as Fermin Ordoñez
 Reiko Aylesworth as Regina Vickers
 Brian J. Smith as Shayn Coleman
 Luke Kirby as Chris Beckner
 Luke Kleintank as Caleb Phipps
 Jimmi Simpson as Logan Pierce
 Paul Sparks as Wilson
 Ebon Moss-Bachrach as Michael Cole
 Luke Macfarlane as Alan Fahey
 Becky Ann Baker as Erica Schmidt
 Dan Lauria as Stanley Amis
 Michael Rispoli as Darien Makris
 Dennis Boutsikaris as Dr. Richard Nelson

Episodes

Development

Production
The series was renewed for a second season in March 2012.

Writing
Nolan said that even though they would continue developing the characters and season-long story arcs, the season would remain a procedural. He compared it to The X-Files, which he deemed a major influence on the show. Showrunner and executive producer Greg Plageman added, "We hate it when we watch a show that has a serialized content, there's a cliffhanger where somebody is placed in jeopardy, and then you come back the next episode and it's like nothing happened. We don't want to do that." Plageman also said, "the nice thing about working with [Jonah] is you never want to feel like you totally nailed it; you want to keep changing and evolving the show. There's always the danger of falling into a rut and feeling formulaic, and we've tried to shy away from that. What we have found is a nice chemistry between our characters that works, but we always reserve the right to surprise the viewers with a twist or a killing." 

Michael Emerson teased, "The arc of the show is a contract between writers and the audience. I'm just the one who solves the little problems in the scenes themselves." The writers said that the first episode, "The Contingency", served as a way to get Reese to act on his own while searching for Finch and it would also answer an important question raised by the series: "Who does the Machine turn to?" 

The writers also explained that they had plans for Amy Acker in the series, following her character's debut on "Firewall". Nolan explained, "Root is stone-cold but it's considered. We don't think of her as a psychopath but someone who is in her own way sympathetic. And the case she is trying to make is, in many ways, something Finch can relate to. You have all these people who want to manipulate the Machine, and Root wants to set it free. What that means, and how her plan ultimately plays out, is something that we're going to see through the course of the season." After the first two episodes, Acker stated that she would return to the series eventually at some point in the season, saying "I think he [Finch] misses me too much." She further added, "And when I do, it's a roller coaster of lots of trouble. A lot of stuff escalates."

The writers explained that among concepts explored the season include: the origins of the Machine and more character development for the main characters. A pivotal moment was Fusco, with star Kevin Chapman saying, "at some point Fusco is going to have to answer for his past.' Chapman said that the season would delve into the question, "is he a good guy doing bad things, or a bad guy doing good things?" Nolan also teased, "the thing we're trying to do with this show, as much as we can, is to keep it dangerous and alive, and keep the narrative unexpected."

Casting

Caviezel, Henson, Chapman and Emerson reprised their roles from the first season as series regulars. Among many characters that were confirmed to return at the beginning of the season included Jay O. Sanders as Special Counsel, Robert John Burke as Patrick Simmons, Annie Parisse as Kara Stanton and Michael Kelly as Mark Snow. The fifth episode, "Bury the Lede" also brought back Paige Turco as Zoe Morgan. Nolan commented, "Paige is spectacular, and sometimes you get that rare alchemy of a piece of casting and a character that just connects. So she'll come back to further complicate things."

Among the many guest stars for the season include Ken Leung and Margo Martindale, who were announced to join the season's first two episodes in July 2012. In August 2012, Paloma Guzmán and Gloria Votsis were announced to get guest star roles in the season. In October 2012, it was reported that Mark Pellegrino would also guest star as "an edgy and charming head of a popular publishing empire." Pellegrino reunited with Emerson, having starred with him on Lost. In the same month, Sterling K. Brown joined in the recurring role of Cal Beecher, "a no-nonsense narcotics detective who will evolve into a potential love interest for Taraji P. Henson’s Detective Carter." This was partly done by the writers in order to explore "a little more about Carter's personal life, what makes her tick. We're hoping to explore who she is and how she became who she is."

Model Karolína Kurková was reported to guest star on an episode as herself. She appeared on "Prisoner's Dilemma" in a subplot where Fusco protects Kurková from Armenian gangsters. The subplot, which is interspersed throughout the episode, takes up less than two minutes of screen time and is played for comic relief.

In January 2013, Sarah Shahi joined the series in a recurring role as Sameen Shaw, "a fearless, sexy and witty operative in a secret paramilitary organization that tracks and eliminates terrorists before they can act." Shaw, who debuted in "Relevance", was deemed an important part of the second season and the writers were open to having her in the third season even before it was officially announced. Nolan described her role as "if James Bond and Sarah Connor had a kid, Shaw would kick its ass." The role, which required Shahi to undergo thorough training for 7 days in order to fight and use weapons, was important for Shahi, who wanted to work with Nolan. She deemed it a role she had never played before. She further said, "I'm used to a lot of love scenes. I'm used to something that requires me to kick up my heels and wink-wink, flirt-flirt with a twirl of my skirt. But this is dark. It's a bit stylized. It's a heightened sense of drama, all the time. The tomboyishness that came out of me doing this was kind of amazing, and I hope just people buy the end result, because it felt really good and quite natural to just kick somebody's ass." Shortly after the series was renewed for a third season, Shahi would be promoted to series regular.

The season also marked the first appearance of two pivotal villains of the series. The first was Clarke Peters as Alonzo Quinn, the head of HR, first appearing on "Bury the Lede". The second was John Nolan as John Greer, first appearing on "Dead Reckoning" and who would serve as the main antagonist of the series until the end of the series. John Nolan was series creator Jonathan Nolan's uncle, with Nolan commenting, "Look, the best bad guys are always English. That's just kind of a rule. And so my uncle came on board in exactly the same fashion as all of these actors, as a memorable turn that became a longer story arc." The season also introduced Control, who would play a pivotal role in the third and fourth season. The producers teased her character before the finale, naming her Mrs. Penn, "a powerful, intelligent and wry 50something femme who never flinches in the face of danger." Control only appears in the season finale by an unseen actress. Camryn Manheim would later appear as the character in the third season.

Filming
Filming in New York City in October was shut down for a few days due to Hurricane Sandy. Production resumed shortly afterward around early November. In February 2013, a major blizzard hit the area but production continued without interruption.

Release

Broadcast
In May 2012, CBS announced that the series would maintain its timeslot, airing episodes on Thursdays at 9:00 p.m. In July 2012, CBS announced that the series would premiere on September 27, 2012.

Marketing
On July 14, 2012, the cast and crew attended the 2012 San Diego Comic-Con to discuss and promote the season and show a sneak peek. Jonathan Nolan, Michael Emerson, Taraji P. Henson, and Kevin Chapman also attended the 2012 New York Comic Con on October 13, 2012 for a Q&A session as well as interviews. The panel also included a surprise appearance by Amy Acker.

Home media release
The second season was released on Blu-ray and DVD in region 1 on September 3, 2013, in region 2 on June 16, 2014, and in region 4 on October 16, 2013.

In 2014, Warner Bros. Television Studios announced that it sold the off-network SVOD of the series to Netflix. On September 1, 2015, the season became available to stream on Netflix. On September 22, 2020, the series left the service and was added to HBO Max on January 23, 2021.

Reception

Ratings

Critical reception
The second season received positive reviews. On Rotten Tomatoes, the season has an approval rating of 100% and average rating of 8.03 out of 10 based on 11 reviews. The site's critical consensus is, "Smartly plotted and consistently thrilling, Person of Interests second season delivers dazzlingly dramatic episodes that skillfully develop the show's overarching narrative."

Tim Surette praised the premiere episode as "vintage Person of Interest amplified, showing off its trademark combination of complex intrigue, creative action, and clever innovation in bigger ways than ever before." He praised guest star Ken Leung's character as "one of the greatest POIs the series has had" and praised the episode's overall narrative, as well as the flashbacks. "Prisoner's Dilemma" and "Relevance" were the two highest-rated episodes of the season, with Surette calling the former "as complete an episode of Person of Interest as there's ever been" and The A.V. Club's Phil Dyess-Nugent praising Jonathan Nolan's directorial work in the latter. The season finale "God Mode" also attracted positive reactions. Nugent called it an "unapologetically kick-ass episode" with some "terrific action set-pieces".

References

External links 
 

Person of Interest seasons
2012 American television seasons
2013 American television seasons